is a former Japanese football player.

Playing career
Kitamura was born in Yokkaichi on May 27, 1982. After graduating from high school, he joined the newly promoted J2 League club, Yokohama FC in 2001. He played many matches as forward and offensive midfielder during the first season. Although the club results were bad every season until 2005, Yokohama FC won the championship in the 2006 season and was promoted to the J1 League. However he left the club at the end of the 2006 season without playing J1. In 2007, he moved to the J2 club Montedio Yamagata. He became a regular player as a forward. Montedio won second place in 2008 and was promoted to J1. Although he played as a regular player every season, he could hardly play in the match and Montedio finished in last place in 2011. In 2012, Montedio was relegated to J2 and he also could hardly play in the match. In 2013, he moved to his local club Veertien Kuwana in the Prefectural Leagues. He retired at the end of the 2013 season.

Club statistics

References

External links

1982 births
Living people
Association football people from Mie Prefecture
Japanese footballers
J1 League players
J2 League players
Yokohama FC players
Montedio Yamagata players
Veertien Mie players
Association football forwards